The Outer Sydney Orbital is a proposed corridor for a motorway and freight rail line in Western Sydney. The motorway is proposed to be signposted M9 or M10. The proposed orbital will run parallel to The Northern Road.

The preferred corridor alignments of the orbital between Marsden Park and Appin has been confirmed and will proceed to the next phase of planning. Land has been reserved for this project.

Alignment
The preferred corridor alignments of the Outer Sydney Orbital have been announced for the following sections:
Stage 1: between Richmond Road, Marsden Park and Hume Motorway - announced in June 2018
Stage 2 Sector 1: between Hume Motorway and Appin Road east of Appin - announced in August 2021

, corridor identification will continue for:
Stage 2 Sector 2: Appin Road and Picton Road corridors
Stage 2 Sector 3: connections in the Illawarra including a potential new Illawarra escarpment crossing.

Grade separated interchanges will be provided at:
 Richmond Road
 Bells Line of Road – Castlereagh Connection: a connection road to Bells Line of Road at Kurrajong via Castlereagh
 Great Western Highway
 M4 Western Motorway
 Southern Access Road (BWSEA)
 Luddenham Road / M12 Motorway / Elizabeth Drive / The Northern Road
 Bringelly Road / Greendale Road
 Camden Valley Way
 Hume Motorway
 Appin Road

History

As part of the State Budget 2014–15, the NSW Government announced a $5.5 billion road package for Western Sydney. It includes $4.6 million for planning the M9 Motorway. The preferred corridor for the motorway was expected to be announced later in 2014 before plans are made for reserving land.

The Outer Sydney Orbital was split into a few stages for separate corridor identification:
Stage 1: between Box Hill and Hume Motorway
Stage 2: between Hume Motorway and Appin Road east of Appin

The orbital was originally planned to cut through the town of Cobbitty. The northern end of the orbital was also truncated from Box Hill to Richmond Road at Marsden Park.

Community consultation for the Stage 2 corridor was undertaken between November 2020 and January 2021. In August 2021, the preferred corridor for Stage 2 from Hume Motorway and Appin Road was confirmed.

References

External links
Outer Sydney Orbital Stage 1 corridor identification - Transport for NSW
Outer Sydney Orbital Stage 2 corridor identification - Transport for NSW

Proposed roads in Australia